Mary Bartlet Leader (March 19, 1918 – April 27, 2004, in Mequon, Wisconsin) was the author of two novels, Triad: A Novel of the Supernatural (1972) and Salem’s Children (1979). Triad was the inspiration behind the popular Fleetwood Mac song "Rhiannon".

Leader died on April 27, 2004, in Mequon, Ozaukee County, Wisconsin where she had been a long time resident.

References

1918 births
2004 deaths
People from Mequon, Wisconsin
Writers from Wisconsin